Lipiny (German: Lipine) is a district of the Upper Silesian town of Świętochłowice, southern Poland. In the north, Lipiny borders the city of Bytom, in the west the city of Ruda Śląska, in the east it borders the districts of Chropaczów and Piaśniki, while in the south Lipiny borders the center of the town. 

Lipiny is the youngest district of Świętochłowice, with history dating back to the early 19th century, when, together with whole Silesia, it belonged to the Kingdom of Prussia. At that time, a folwark, mentioned in 1802, existed there, as part of the Chropaczow estate of Georg Christian Carl Henschel. The folwark, whose area was 75 hectares, was located at the edge of a forest, where Lipiny's main thoroughfare, Chorzowska Street (former Kronprinzstrasse) runs now. For some time, the sole resident of the estate was a voigt named Lipina, after whom the district was later named. Near his residence, several houses of forest workers were later built. 

In the 19th century Lipiny, or Lipine, as part of the German Empire quickly developed and emerged as a major industrial center, with Zinc Smelter Silesia, opened in 1847 as Konstancja Steelworks. The plant, which was vastly expanded in the 1860s and 1880s, was in the early 20th century the largest zinc smelter in Europe. In 1961, Zinc Smelter Silesia was merged with Zinc Smelter Wełnowiec, located in Katowice (former Hohenlohe Steelworks), to create Metallurgical Works Silesia, based in Katowice. In 1998–2000, the Lipiny smelter was gradually closed, and in 2001 the former plant was purchased by a private company. 

By mid-19th century, the population of Lipiny reached over 1100, and quickly grew, due to the rapid expansion of the settlement. In 1864, first hospital was opened in Lipine. Its construction was financed by the zinc smelter, and in 1873, a post office was opened. Three years later, Lipiny received its first rail connection with Bytom. The quickly growing settlement was in 1879 detached from Chropaczów, waterworks were constructed and a fire station. In 1872, Roman Catholic St. Barbara church was completed, and in 1875, Matylda Coal Mine was opened. By the early 20th century, Lipiny had a tram line to Bytom.

In the early 20th century, several ethnic Polish organizations were founded in Lipiny, together with Polish choir and a bookstore. Polish residents of the settlement actively participated in the Silesian Uprisings. In the 1921 Upper Silesian Plebiscite, 56.4% of residents of Lipiny voted for Poland, and as a result, the settlement was annexed into the Second Polish Republic. In 1924, a monument dedicated to the Silesian Uprisings was unveiled in Lipiny. In the interbellum period Lipiny was regarded as one of the most advanced and developed among Polish communes, but also one of the most polluted in Europe. It was also home to a soccer team Naprzód Lipiny. 

In the night of September 2/3 1939, Lipiny was seized by the Wehrmacht. It remained in the Third Reich until January 28, 1945, when the Red Army units entered the settlement. In 1946, all plants were nationalized, and on March 17, 1951, Lipiny was annexed by the town of Świętochłowice.

Sources 
 Taki był początek Lipin (in Polish)

Districts of Świętochłowice